
Cieszyn County is a unit of territorial administration and local government (powiat) in Silesian Voivodeship, southern Poland, on the Czech and Slovak border. It came into being on January 1, 1999, as a result of the Polish local government reforms passed in 1998.

As of 2019 its total population is 178,145, out of which the population of Cieszyn is 34,513, that of Ustroń is 16,073, that of Skoczów is 14,385, that of Wisła is 11,132, that of Strumień is 3,718, and the rural population is 98,324.

History
The county was first created after Revolutions of 1848 in the Austrian Empire in 1850 as Politischer Bezirk Teschen, one of the seven counties in Austrian Silesia. After World War I, fall of Austria-Hungary, Polish–Czechoslovak War and the division of Cieszyn Silesia in 1920, the territory of the county was divided between Czechoslovakia and Poland. The bigger part of the Austrian county found in Czechoslovakia was superseded by Český Těšín District and smaller part found in Poland, was enlarged by four municipalities of the Austrian Bezirk Freistadt and more than a dozen from Bezirk Bielitz and was admissioned to Silesian Voivodeship. Following the Munich Agreement, in October 1938 the Zaolzie region was annexed by Poland and on 27 September Český Těšín was joined with Cieszyn and 53 municipalities were also adjoined to Cieszyn County. It was then annexed by Nazi Germany at the beginning of World War II with the county known as Landkreis Teschen. After the war pre-1938 borders were restored. In 1975 the county-level division of Poland was replaced with 49 voivodeships, with the territory of Cieszyn County being encompassed by Bielsko-Biała Voivodeship. It was recreated on January 1, 1999, within Silesian Voivodeship, pursuant to the Polish local government reforms adopted in 1998.

Neighbouring counties
Cieszyn County is bordered by the city of Jastrzębie-Zdrój and Pszczyna County to the north, and the city of Bielsko-Biała, Bielsko County and Żywiec County to the east. It also borders the Czech Republic to the west and Slovakia to the south.

Administrative division
The county is subdivided into 12 gminas (three urban, two urban-rural and seven rural). These are listed in the following table, in descending order of population.

See also
 Cieszyn Silesia
 Euroregion Cieszyn Silesia
 Olza (river)

References

 
Cieszyn